Harry Weldon may refer to:

 Thomas Dewar Weldon (1896–1958), known as Harry, British philosopher
 Harry Weldon (comedian) (1881–1930), English comedian and music hall performer